Till Death Do Us Part is the fourth studio album by the Houston gangsta rap group the Geto Boys, released in March 1993 on Rap-A-Lot Records.

Background
Till Death Do Us Part was produced by the Rap-A-Lot in-house producer N.O. Joe. It featured guitar, bass guitar and keyboards by Mike Dean, bass guitar by Roger Tausz, bass guitar and percussion by Preston Middleton, and scratches by DJ Domination. Rapper Willie D had left the group in 1992 temporarily to pursue a solo career. In his position, fellow Rap-A-Lot member Big Mike joined Scarface and Bushwick Bill for this album. 

There were four music videos releases for the songs in Till Death Do Us Part, for "Six Feet Deep", "Crooked Officer", "Straight Gangstaism" and "Street Life". The music video for "Street Life" was originally released for the song as an individual single for the soundtrack of the movie South Central and was also added to the album. The album version for "Straight Gangstaism" has two verses by Big Mike and one by his group-mate from Convicts, Mr. 3-2, and it was released as a single to boost Big Mike's popularity as a member of the Geto Boys. To avoid confusion among fans and to improve promotion, the video version (and the radio edit) added a fourth verse by Scarface to the end of the song.

Reception

Till Death Do Us Part became the group's first #1 on the R&B/hip hop charts, and also included the group's second top 40 Billboard Hot 100 single, "Six Feet Deep" (which used a sample from The Commodores' 1977 hit single "Easy"). Other singles released from the album were "Crooked Officer" and "Straight Gangstaism".

Track listing

Charts

Album

Singles

Certifications

See also
List of Billboard number-one R&B albums of 1993

References

1993 albums
Geto Boys albums
Rap-A-Lot Records albums
Priority Records albums
Albums produced by N.O. Joe
Horrorcore albums
G-funk albums